Arthur Teixeira Viégas (born October 29, 1980) is a Brazilian footballer who plays as a forward.

Born in Rio de Janeiro, Arthur began playing football with Centro de Futebol Zico Sociedade Esportiva.  After playing for Botafogo Futebol Clube (PB), Sampaio Corrêa Futebol Clube, Clube Náutico Capibaribe and Clube do Remo in Brazil, he signed with Kuwaiti Division One side Al Salibikhaet.

References

External links
  
  

Living people
1980 births
Association football forwards
Botafogo Futebol Clube (PB) players
Sampaio Corrêa Futebol Clube players
Clube Náutico Capibaribe players
Clube do Remo players
Al-Sulaibikhat SC players
Footballers from Rio de Janeiro (city)
Brazilian footballers